The 2017–18 season was the 119th in Athletic Club’s history and the 87th in the top tier.

Squad
According to the official website. Unai Núñez wore number 12 in domestic matches from the beginning of 2018.

Player statistics

Disciplinary record
Iñigo Martínez' and Iñaki Williams' yellow cards against Celta Vigo on matchday 30 were removed in April 2018.

From the youth system

Transfer
In

Out

Staff
According to the official website.

Pre-season and friendlies

Competitions

Overview

La Liga

League table

Results summary

Round by round

Matches

Copa del Rey

Round of 32

UEFA Europa League

Qualifying phase

Third qualifying round

Play-off round

Group stage

Knockout phase

Round of 32

Round of 16

References

Athletic Bilbao seasons
Athletic Bilbao
Athletic Bilbao